At the 1915 Far Eastern Championship Games, the athletics events were held in Shanghai, China in May. A total of seventeen events were contested in the men-only competition.

Medal summary

Medal table

References

Far Eastern Championships. GBR Athletics. Retrieved on 2014-12-18.

1915
Far Eastern Championship Games
1915 Far Eastern Championship Games
1915 in Chinese sport